Vincenzo Marchese (born 19 May 1983) is an Italian-German former professional footballer who played as a midfielder.

External links

1983 births
Living people
Footballers from Baden-Württemberg
German people of Italian descent
German footballers
Italian footballers
Association football midfielders
3. Liga players
SSV Ulm 1846 players
Stuttgarter Kickers II players
Stuttgarter Kickers players
Segunda División B players
CD Atlético Baleares footballers
German expatriate footballers
Italian expatriate footballers
German expatriate sportspeople in Spain
Italian expatriate sportspeople in Spain
Expatriate footballers in Spain